Renown Sports Club is a Sri Lankan professional football club based in Kotahena, Colombo. Founded in 1981 by the Peeris Brothers, the club currently competes in the Sri Lanka Champions League.

History
Renown SC was founded in 1981. The club emerged champions in the Sri Lanka Champions League four times in 1990, 1993, 1994 and 2009. They became the first Sri Lankan club to sign numerous Indian players for a single season, signing Shaji Varghese, Shibu Stellas and Shyam Simon (all from Kerala) in 2004. In 2004, Renown participated in the 110th IFA Shield in 2004, in Kolkata.

They appeared in the 2010 edition of AFC President's Cup, but could not proceeded to the knockout stages.

Home ground

Renown uses Sugathadasa Stadium in Colombo, as its home ground. The stadium has a capacity of nearly 25,000 spectators.

Achievements
Domestic tournaments

1982, 1987 : Silver Cup Champions.
1983 : Colombo League "C" Champions.
1983 : Y.A Sugathadasa Memorial Cup Champions.
1989, 1991 : Abdul Rahuman Gold Cup Champions.
1989 : Mayor's Cup Champions.
1989 : M.H. Mohamed Gold Cup Champions.
1989, 1991 : Jayantha Mallimarachchi Memorial Cup Champion
1989 : Vincent Peeris Memorial Cup Champion. (Renown SC Founder)
1991 : Police Invitation Cup Champion.
1992 : Sri Lanka School Invitation Cup Champions.
1993 : Lawrence Fernando Memorial Cup Champions. (Ratnam SC Founder)
1993 : Mahinda Aluvihara Memorial Cup Champions.
1994 : Ratnam Invitation Cup (Renown Vs Malaysia FA Champions).
1998 : Viven Gunawardana Memorial Trophy Champions.
2009 : Futsal Champions.
2009 : Dialog Champion League Champion.
2012 : Dialog Champion League. Runners up.
2015 : Dialog Champion League. Runners up. 
2016 : Dialog Champion League. Runners up. 
2017 : Dialog Champion League. Runners up.  

Sri Lanka Football Premier League: 4
Winners: 1990, 1993, 1994, 2009

Sri Lanka FA Cup: 6
Winners: 1986–87, 1988–89, 1989–90, 1993–94, 1994–95, 2002–03
Runners-up: 1983–84, 1984–85, 1985–86, 1995–96, 1998–99, 2003–04

Colombo League Gold Cup Champions: 3
Winners: 1989, 1990, 2003.

POMIS Cup: 1
Winners: 1987

Honours and records

International
POMIS Cup (Maldives): 4 appearances
Champions 1987, 1988, 1990, 1999

Continental
AFC President's Cup: 1 appearance
2010: 4th (group stage)

Domestic
Ratnam Invitation Cup
Champions 1994

Records
AIFF Vittal Trophy (India): 1 appearance
IFA Shield (India): 1 appearance

See also
 List of football clubs in Sri Lanka

References

External links
Football Federation of Sri Lanka
Past achievements
Official website
Official Facebook profile

Football clubs in Sri Lanka
1981 establishments in Sri Lanka